Prince Abdul Mateen (Jawi: عبد المتين; born 10 August 1991) is a prince of Brunei. He is the tenth child and fourth son of Sultan Hassanal Bolkiah of Brunei by his former second wife, Puan Hajah Mariam binti Haji Abdul Aziz.

Education
Prince Mateen received his primary education at the St. Andrew's School in Bandar Seri Begawan, Brunei. He continued his secondary education at the Paduka Seri Begawan Sultan Science College and Jerudong International School, both of which are the top schools in Brunei. 

In July 2014, Prince Mateen received his Bachelor of Arts degree in international politics from King's College London at the Barbican Centre in London. In July 2016, Prince Mateen was awarded a Master of Arts degree in international studies and diplomacy from the School of Oriental and African Studies, University of London.

Military career 
On 9 May 2010, Prince Mateen began his Commissioning Course for Regular Army Officers along with 200 recruits in Royal Military Academy Sandhurst. On 15 April 2011, Prince Mateen graduated from the commissioning course as an officer cadet of Royal Military Academy Sandhurst, United Kingdom and promoted to the rank of Second Lieutenant. According to a Borneo Bulletin report, Mateen was promoted to a rank of a Substantive Lieutenant later on 9 July 2012.

His promotion ceremony to Acting Captain was held on 31 August 2016 and would come into effect on 9 May later that year. On 28 April 2017, he completed a seven-month Elementary Flying Training at RAF Cranwell, and later in March 2018, Prince Mateen was qualified as a helicopter pilot in Defence Helicopter Flying School at RAF Shawbury, in which his father awarded him his flying brevet (wings).

On 20 May 2021, Prince Mateen was promoted to the rank of Major. Later that year, Prince Mateen had undergone the The All Arms Commando Course (AACC) at the Commando Training Centre Royal Marines (CTCRM) in the United Kingdom for eleven weeks from the 20th of September to the 2nd of December.

Sports career
Prince 'Abdul Mateen has represented his country in polo at the 2017 and 2019 Southeast Asian Games.

Notably on 7 April 2007, the AM Gunners captained by Abdul Mateen ended in a 1–1 draw against team Projek Ikan Pusu (PIP) during a Charity football match. The match which took place at the Hassanal Bolkiah National Stadium collected a total of B$12,192.

Honours

  Order of the Crown of Brunei (DKMB)
  Order of Paduka Keberanian Laila Terbilang First Class (DPKT) – Dato Paduka Seri
  Hassanal Bolkiah Sultan Medal (PHBS)
  Golden Jubilee Medal – (5 October 2017)
  Silver Jubilee Medal – (5 October 1992)
  National Day Silver Jubilee Medal – (23 February 2009)
  General Service Medal (Armed Forces)
  Royal Brunei Armed Forces Golden Jubilee Medal – (31 May 2011)

Ancestry

References

External links

|-

1991 births
Living people
Bruneian people of Arab descent
Bruneian people of Japanese descent
Bruneian people of English descent
Alumni of King's College London
Alumni of SOAS University of London
Bruneian royalty
Bruneian polo players
Southeast Asian Games medalists for Brunei
Southeast Asian Games medalists in polo
Competitors at the 2017 Southeast Asian Games
Competitors at the 2019 Southeast Asian Games
Graduates of the Royal Military Academy Sandhurst
Helicopter pilots
Sons of monarchs